Eliot Albert Cross Druce (20 June 1876 – 24 October 1934) was an English amateur cricketer who played first-class cricket between 1897 and 1913. He was born at Weybridge in Surrey, the son of Albert Druce, and grew up at Thornhill in Sevenoaks in Kent.

Education
Druce attended The Beacon, now called New Beacon, in Sevenoaks, Marlborough School and then went up to Trinity College, Cambridge in 1895. He took a law degree, graduating in 1898 and becoming a solicitor in 1901. He was later employed in the offices of the Duchy of Lancaster.

Cricketing career
Druce did not play for the Marlborough cricket team but made his first-class cricket debut for Cambridge University against Marylebone Cricket Club (MCC) at Lord's in 1897. He played a total of three matches for the university and was awarded a hockey Blue in 1898.

He played one match for MCC against Cambridge in 1898, before making an appearance for Kent County Cricket Club in the 1898 County Championship against Sussex at Catford. He played twice more for Kent in the 1900 County Championship and over a decade later he made three first-class appearances for Free Foresters in matches against Oxford University and Cambridge University. Druce also played a number of non-first-class matches for Kent Second XI, MCC and Fee Foresters, appearing as late as 1925 for MCC.

Later life
Druce married Elizabeth Swann, the daughter of Sir Charles Swann on 16 September 1913. He died suddenly at Brompton, London in October 1934 aged 58. His cousin Frank Druce played Test cricket for England, while another cousin Walter Druce and his uncle George Druce both played first-class cricket.

Notes

External links

1876 births
1934 deaths
People from Weybridge
Alumni of Trinity College, Cambridge
English cricketers
Cambridge University cricketers
Marylebone Cricket Club cricketers
Kent cricketers
Free Foresters cricketers